JustProperty is a Dubai-based real estate website. It was launched in 2008 as Justproperty.com by Alex Nicholas and Siddharth Singh. In addition to UAE, there are versions for Qatar, Bahrain, Egypt, Oman, Jordan, Saudi Arabia, and Lebanon.

The listing database has more than 96,000 live listings including homes, villas, apartments and commercial buildings.

History
In 2008, the company started operation with an online portal JustRentals.com, which was mainly into rental property listings. In 2010, JRD Group launched justproperty.com for listings for sale properties. By the end of 2014, justrentals.com merges to justproperty.com as a single portal for rental and sale property listings.

In 2015, the company started operations in Qatar and Saudi Arabia also region's venture capital firms iMENA Group announced its investment in JustProperty Group.

In 2019, the website was acquired by Property Finder.

References

External links 
 
 
 

Internet properties established in 2008
Real estate websites
Companies based in Dubai
Emirati companies established in 2008
Real estate companies established in 2008